The Love Express is a 1931 German musical comedy film directed by Robert Wiene and starring Georg Alexander, Dina Gralla and Joseph Schmidt. No print of the film is known to survive, and it is therefore a lost film. It was one of a cycle of operetta films made during the early sound era. A French-language version, Venetian Nights (Nuits de Venise), also directed by Wiene, was released the same year.

It is sometimes known by the alternative title of Eight Days of Happiness. It was made at the Bavaria Studios in Munich. The film's sets were designed by the art director Ludwig Reiber.

Cast
 Georg Alexander as Kurt Weidingen
 Dina Gralla as Annie
 Joseph Schmidt as Enrico Tonelli, Sänger
 Angelo Ferrari as Conte Orsino
 Karl Graumann as Williams - Kurts Diener
 Therese Giehse as Frau Mayer
 Wilhelm Marx as Der Alt
 Harry Hertzsch as Fritz - dessen Freund
 Elise Aulinger as Annies Hausfrau

References

Bibliography

External links
 

1931 films
German musical comedy films
1930s German-language films
Films directed by Robert Wiene
Operetta films
Lost German films
Films of the Weimar Republic
Rail transport films
Films set in Berlin
Films set in Venice
1931 musical comedy films
German multilingual films
Bavaria Film films
Films shot at Bavaria Studios
German black-and-white films
1931 multilingual films
1931 lost films
Lost musical comedy films
1930s German films